Pelophryne guentheri is a species of toad in the family Bufonidae. It is endemic to Borneo and only known from the lowlands of Sarawak, Malaysia, though it is likely to occur also in Sabah (Malaysia) and northeastern Kalimantan (Indonesia). Its natural habitats are tropical moist lowland forests and intermittent freshwater marshes. It is threatened by habitat loss.

References

Pelophryne
Amphibians of Malaysia
Endemic fauna of Borneo
Endemic fauna of Malaysia
Amphibians described in 1882
Taxonomy articles created by Polbot
Amphibians of Borneo